Seïdou Mama Sika (born 1949 in Nikki, Benin) was the Minister of the Interior of Benin from February 9, 2005 until April 2006. He attended the Lycée Technique in Coulibaly. He became an air brigade general in 1999.

References

1949 births
Living people
Government ministers of Benin
Date of birth missing (living people)
People from Borgou Department
21st-century Beninese politicians